Originally, the Preisach model of hysteresis generalized magnetic hysteresis as the relationship between the magnetic field and magnetization of a magnetic material as the parallel connection of independent relay hysterons. It was first suggested in 1935 by Ferenc (Franz) Preisach in the German academic journal Zeitschrift für Physik. A sample of iron, for example, may have evenly distributed magnetic domains, resulting in a net magnetic moment of zero.

Mathematically similar model seems to have been independently developed in other fields of science and engineering. One notable example is the model of capillary hysteresis in porous materials developed by Everett and co-workers. Since then, following the work of people like M. Krasnoselkii, A. Pokrovskii, A. Visintin, and I.D. Mayergoyz, the model has become widely accepted as a general mathematical tool for the description of hysteresis phenomena of different kinds.

Nonideal relay
The relay hysteron is the fundamental building block of the Preisach model. Its I/O map takes the form of a loop, as shown:

Above, a relay of magnitude 1,  defines the "switch-off" threshold, and  defines the "switch-on" threshold.

As we increase , the output remains low until  reaches —at which point the output switches "on." Further increasing  has no change. Decreasing ,  does not go low until  reaches  again. It is apparent that the relay operator  takes the path of a loop, and its next state depends on its past state.

This definition of the hysteron shows that the current value  of the complete hysteresis loop depends upon the history of the input variable .

Discrete Preisach model

The Preisach model consists of many relay hysterons connected in parallel, given weights, and summed. This can be visualized by a block diagram:

With increasing , the true hysteresis curve is approximated better.

In the limit as  approaches infinity, we obtain the continuous Preisach model.

Preisach plane
One of the easiest ways to look at the Preisach model is using a geometric interpretation.
Consider a plane of coordinates . On this plane, each point  is mapped to a specific relay hysteron . Each relay can be plotted on this so-called Preisach plane with its  values.  Depending on their distribution on the Preisach plane, the relay hysterons can represent hysteresis with good accuracy.

We consider only the half-plane  as any other case does not have a physical equivalent in nature.

Next, we take a specific point on the half plane and build a right triangle by drawing two lines parallel to the axes, both from the point to the line .

We now present the Preisach density function, denoted . As a default we say that outside the right triangle .

A modified formulation of the classical Preisach model has been presented, allowing analytical expression of 
the  Everett function. This  makes  the  model  considerably  faster  and  especially  adequate  for inclusion in electromagnetic field computation or electric circuit analysis codes.

Vector Preisach model 

The vector Preisach model is constructed as the linear superposition of scalar models. For considering the uniaxial anisotropy of the material, Everett functions are expanded by Fourier coefficients. In this case, the measured and simulated curves are in a very good agreement.
Another approach uses different relay hysteron, closed surfaces defined on the 3D input space. In general spherical hysteron is used for vector hysteresis in 3D, and circular hysteron is used for vector hysteresis in 2D.

Computer implementation of Preisach model 
The Preisach model has been implemented in Python and Matlab.

Applications 
The Preisach model has been applied to model hysteresis in a wide variety of fields, including to study irreversible changes in soil hydraulic conductivity as a result of saline and sodic conditions, the modeling of soil water retention and the effect of stress and strains on soil and rock structures.

See also
 Jiles–Atherton model
 Stoner–Wohlfarth model

References

External links
 University College, Cork Hysteresis Tutorial
 Budapest University of Technology and Economics, Hungary Matlab implementation of the Preisach model developed by Zs. Szabó.
  Python implementation of Preisach Model.
  Matlab implementation of Preisach Model.

Magnetic hysteresis
Hysteresis